is a type of Japanese pottery traditionally from Hasami, Nagasaki prefecture. Originally produced for common people,  Hasami porcelain has a history of 400 years.

In 1599, when the Korean potter Yi Sam-pyeong was brought to Japan by the feudal lord of the Ōmura clan, Ōmura Yoshiaki(大村喜前Ōmura Yoshiaki) after the Japanese Invasion of Korea, manufacturers in Hatanohara, Furusaraya, Yamanita and Hasami began the construction of climbing kilns and pottery centers.

Typical Hasami porcelain uses underglaze cobalt blue and celadon, but at first they produced stonewares.  Later the materials for porcelain were found, so gradually they started to make porcelain. They eventually became a specialty product in Omura Domain, where they produced the biggest quantity of porcelain in the country in the latter Edo period.

Omura Domain established a Sarayama public office to manage and put more effort to manufacturing Hasami porcelain. Most of their products are for the daily usage such as Kurawanka-wan. It is one of the most well-known Hasami porcelain, which is a strong, heavy and simple bowl of arabesque design for common people. Hasami porcelain gave a strong influence on food culture at that time.

Hasami porcelains are produced in the huge climbing kiln and because of its economical prices, spread around the country and eventually all over the world. The remains of kilns found around the town tell us the historic aspects of Hasami porcelain.

The manufacturers today are trying to develop new techniques to produce quality daily dishes while keeping on its tradition cultivated with “stone and fire”.

References

External links 
 http://www.hasamiyaki.or.jp/

Culture in Nagasaki Prefecture
Japanese pottery
Japanese porcelain